Bajan list is a list of Polish fighter aces of World War II. It was released in 1946 and is named after the officer who supervised the project, colonel Jerzy Bajan.

History
The list of Polish Air Force and Polish Air Forces in Great Britain fighter pilots air victories was compiled for the Polish Air Force Historical Commission by colonel Jerzy Bajan of the Fighter Claim Commission, and a liaison officer at the RAF Fighter Command headquarters. The publication, released in 1946, was titled Polish Fighter Pilots Achievements during the Second World War. Not all documents (particularly for the first years) could be recovered at that time, so some of the data was based on interviews; after reviewing earlier documents and statistics Bajan's methodology attempted to reduce the number of false reports.

List

According to the final list Polish pilots accounted for 105 aircraft destroyed during the Polish September Campaign (most of these occurred during the first six days of the war). The number of kills during the Battle of Britain is estimated at about 2698, many of them by the No. 303 Fighter Squadron.

The list includes 447 entries, with one Czech pilot, Josef František (who joined Polish Air Force as a volunteer), and five entries for the rare cases where victories attributed to the units, rather than individuals. The leading Polish ace, according to the list, is general Stanisław Skalski, with almost 19 confirmed kills. 42 Polish pilots scored 5 or more victories during the war.

The top 50 pilots from the Bajan list are:

See also
List of World War II aces from Poland

References